Eusiderin is a neolignan found in Virola sp and Aniba sp.

References

Lignans